Survivor(s) may refer to:

Actual survivors

Last survivors of historical events

Arts, entertainment, and media

Fictional entities
 Survivors, characters in the 1997 KKnD video-game series
 The Survivors, or the New Survivors Foundation, a fictional cult from Robert Muchamore's a 2006 novel Divine Madness

Films
 Survivor (1987 film), a film written by Bima Stagg
 Survivor (2008 film), a film featuring Cyril Nri
 Survivor (2014 film), a film featuring Danielle Chuchran and Kevin Sorbo
 Survivor (film), a 2015 British spy-thriller starring Milla Jovovich and Pierce Brosnan
 Survivors (2015 film), a British horror
 Survivors (2018 film), a Sierra Leonean documentary
 Survivors (2022 film), a Nigerian comedy
 The Survivors (1983 film)
 The Survivor (2016 film), a short about the 2014 APS Massacre

Games 
 Survivor (1982 video game), a 1982 shooter game
 Survivor (1987 video game), a 1987 8-bit action game
 Survivor (2001 video game), a tie-in to the Survivor reality TV franchise
 Survivors (video game), 1986, published by Atlantis Software
 Resident Evil Survivor, a 2000 light gun shooter
 Star Wars Jedi: Survivor, an upcoming 2023 action-adventure video game

Literature 
 Survivor (Octavia Butler novel), a 1978 science fiction novel by Octavia Butler
 Survivor (Gonzalez novel), a 2004 horror novel by J. F. Gonzalez
 Survivor (Palahniuk novel), a 1999 satirical novel by Chuck Palahniuk
 "Survivor" (story), a 2004 novella in Accelerando by Charles Stross
 Survivor, a 1988 novel by Christina Crawford
 Survivor, a 2004 novel by William W. Johnstone that begins The Last Rebel series
 Survivor, a 1997 novel by Tabitha King
 Survivor, a 2011 novel by James Clancy Phelan
 Survivors (novel series), series of children's novels by Erin Hunter
 Survivors (Star Trek), 1989 Star Trek: The Next Generation novel by Jean Lorrah
 Survivors, a 1976 novel by Terry Nation, adapted from the eponymous 1970s TV series
 Survivors: A Novel of the Coming Collapse, 2011 novel by James Wesley Rawles
 Survivors, a French comic book in the Worlds of Aldebaran comic book series

Music

Groups and labels
 Survivor (band), an American rock band
 Survivor Records, a British Christian music record label

Albums
 Survivor (Randy Bachman 1978 album), or the title song
 Survivor (Eric Burdon album),1977
 Survivor (Destiny's Child album), 2001
 Survivor (Fifteen album), 2000
 Survivor (George Fox album), 1998
 Survivor (Survivor album), 1979
 Survivor (Funker Vogt album), 2002
 Survivor, a 2017 album by Hillary Hawkins
 Survivors (Max Roach album), 1984
 Survivors (Samson album), 1979

Songs
 "Survivor" (Destiny's Child song), 2001
 "Survivor" (Elena Paparizou song), 2014
 "Survivor" (TVXQ song), 2009
 "Survivor", a 1978 song by Cindy Bullens
 "Survivor", a 1984 song by Mike Francis
 "Survivor", a 2009 song by Mavado featuring Akon
 "Survivor", a 2016 song by M.I.A.
 "Survivor", a 2005 song by Vanilla Ice from Platinum Underground
 "Survivor", a 2016 song by Zach Williams
 "Survivors", a 2015 song by Selena Gomez
 "Survivors", a 2015 song by Hardwell and Dannic
 "Survivors", a 2016 song by The Afters from Live On Forever
 "Survivors", a 2014 song by Zomboy and MUST DIE!

Television

Series
 Survivor (franchise), a reality-television show with numerous international versions:
 Australian Survivor
 Survivor (American TV series)
 Survivor (British TV series)
 Survivor (Israeli TV series), formerly Survivor 10
 Survivor BG, Bulgaria
 Survivor Philippines
 Survivor South Africa
 Survivor Srbija, Serbia
 See the main article for a list of other international versions
 Survivor Series, a professional wrestling pay-per-view event
 Survivors (1975 TV series), a British post-apocalyptic fiction series
 Survivors (2008 TV series), an adaptation of Terry Nation's eponymous book

Episodes
 "Survivors" (Babylon 5), 1994 television series episode
 "Survivors" (Supergirl), 2016 episode of American TV series Supergirl
 "The Survivors" (Star Trek: The Next Generation), 1989

Other uses 
Survivor guilt, a mental condition
 Survivor (horse), a racehorse that won the first Preakness Stakes in 1873
 Survivor: The Ride!, a roller coaster in California's Great America, in Santa Clara, California, U.S.

See also

 The Survivor (disambiguation)
 Sole Survivor (disambiguation)
 Lone Survivor (disambiguation)
 Survivor Song, a 2020 horror novel by American author Paul Tremblay
 Survival (disambiguation)
 Survive (disambiguation)
 Surviving (disambiguation)
 
 Survivants (disambiguation)